Giannis Bastianos (born 29 April 1998) is a Greek professional footballer who plays as a winger for Super League 2 club Egaleo.

References

1998 births
Living people
Greek footballers
Greece youth international footballers
Greece under-21 international footballers
Super League Greece players
Football League (Greece) players
Super League Greece 2 players
Asteras Tripolis F.C. players
Veria F.C. players
Apollon Smyrnis F.C. players
Levadiakos F.C. players
Apollon Larissa F.C. players
Association football wingers
Sportspeople from Chios